The Sabah scaly-toed gecko (Lepidodactylus ranauensis) is a species of gecko. It is endemic to Sabah (Borneo).

References

Lepidodactylus
Reptiles described in 1988
Endemic fauna of Malaysia
Endemic fauna of Borneo
Reptiles of Malaysia
Reptiles of Borneo